Gulnaz is an Afghan woman and rape victim. She was raped by her cousin's husband in 2009 and became pregnant. She was then charged with adultery, a crime in Afghanistan. She was initially sentenced to two years in jail, which was later raised to twelve, and she gave birth to a daughter in jail.

The American lawyer Kimberley Motley represented her and successfully submitted a pardon application to President Hamid Karzai. More than five thousand people signed the petition for Gulnaz's release. On December 2, 2011 President Karzai signed her pardon.

Gulnaz complained to authorities that her cousin's husband had raped her only after she began vomiting - a sign of pregnancy - in order to avoid social stigma and family conflicts. The Afghan authorities sentenced her to 12 years in jail. This decision resulted in world-wide criticism for Afghanistan's abysmal human rights record.

The entire world outside Afghanistan discovered her plight when the European Union blocked the broadcast of a documentary about her ordeal. This attracted international attention, shock, and criticism from human rights activists. Her case caused alarm. It highlighted the plight of many Afghan women serving similar sentences in prison - even after the overthrow of Taliban government. Reports then came out that she had agreed to marry her attacker to gain freedom and legitimize her daughter. The reports were confirmed false when President Karzai gave Gulnaz an unconditional pardon and she was not required to marry her attacker.

Documentary film
Gulnaz's story was included in a European Union documentary on Afghan women jailed for zina (moral crimes). However, the European Union blocked the release of the documentary because of concerns for the safety of the portrayed women. Human rights activists wanted to expose injustices meted out to Afghan women, in the name of moral crimes, by the Afghan judicial system. Amnesty International wanted the release of documentary to bring to light one of Afghanistan's most shameful judicial practices.

Accountability for her plight
Gulnaz's case not only attracted international attention, but also posed primitive questions about the veracity of governance in Afghanistan. Speaking to the BBC correspondent Caroline Wyatt, Gulnaz said, "I don't want to have anything to do with Afghanistan government again, because they put innocent people in prison. What kind of government is this? What kind of Afghanistan is this? My attacker committed a crime, and they arrested me!"

Her future
Speaking to BBC correspondent Caroline Wyatt, a local said, "If she went home, her brothers would kill her because of the shame she brought on her family." However, she is willing to marry the rapist to preserve her family's honour. She said, "I'll marry him, if his family finds a wife for my brother and pays dowry to me. There is no other way, if the families can't agree each other, they will become enemies."

Speaking to CNN's correspondent Fareed Zakaria, President Hamid Karzai said her case appeared to be a "misjudgment" which he had resolved by pardoning her. He further added, it's her choice who she marries or who she doesn't marry. He claimed Islam gives her that right.

Karzai also promised the West that he would make sure that there is no "miscarriage" of justice once the international forces withdraw. His aim was to make the Judiciary distinguish rape and adultery.

Kimberly Motley, Gulnaz's lawyer, said Afghanistan treats women as second-class citizens. Women are often mistreated by Afghanistan's Judicial system as illustrated with Gulnaz case. Only time will tell if Gulnaz's conservative family will accept her and her child, Masqa, and whether she will marry the rapist who is in prison at present or not.

Criticism
According to Heather Barr from Human Rights Watch, who is carrying out research among Afghan female prisoners said that many of the women prisoners were victims of abuse by husbands, relatives and also by those who are supposed to protect them, namely state apparatus including the police and judiciary.

According to Vygaudas Usackas, the EU's Ambassador and Special Representative to Afghanistan], in spite of it having been ten years since the overthrow of the Taliban regime, Afghan women continue "to suffer in unimaginable conditions, deprived of even the most basic human rights".

Bilal Sarwary, from BBC in Kabul, says the recent cases of violence against women in the Afghan region are embarrassing for the government]. Afghan women's rights activists are also demanding an end to the culture of impunity.

Muslim women critics are highlighting the negligence of Afghan officials in prosecuting rape cases and beatings suffered by women, in spite of new laws being brought in. They say that indictments were filed on just 155 occasions out of 2,299 incidents of violence against women. They also allege that despite reforms being brought in by President Karzai which are backed up by western countries after the overthrow of the Taliban government, the laws to eliminate violence against women are not enforced.

When the CNN correspondent spoke to a spokesman of the prosecutor to comment on the case he replied that "there are hundreds of such cases pending".

References

External links
 Afghanistan releases jailed rape victim after 'she agrees to marry attacker'
 Taiwannews.com.tw
 Afghan woman's choice: Wed rapist or stay in jail
 Jailed Afghan rape victim has sentence reduced, remains in jail
 Rape victim jailed for  adultery pardoned
 Uprisingradio.org
 Edition.cnn.com
 Jailed Afghan rape victim freed

Afghan victims of crime
Living people
Year of birth missing (living people)